Strophanthus eminii is a species of flowering plant in the Apocynaceae family. Its fragrant flowers feature a pink with white turning red corolla tube, white turning yellow with red spots and streaks inside. Vernacular names for the plant include "spider tresses" and "poison arrow vine". Strophanthus eminii is used in local medicinal treatments for snakebites, skin diseases and wounds and also as an anthelmintic. The plant has been used as arrow poison. It is native to Democratic Republic of Congo, Tanzania and Zambia.

References

eminii
Plants described in 1892
Plants used in traditional African medicine
Flora of the Democratic Republic of the Congo
Flora of Tanzania
Flora of Zambia
Taxa named by Paul Friedrich August Ascherson
Taxa named by Ferdinand Albin Pax